Copper telluride may refer to:

Weissite, a mineral, Cu2−xTe
Rickardite, a mineral, Cu7Te5 (or Cu3−x (x = 0 to 0.36)Te2)
Copper(I) telluride,  Cu2Te
Copper(II) telluride, CuTe, which occurs as the mineral vulcanite
Copper ditelluride,  CuTe2
Tellurium copper, copper alloy with tellurium

See also
Kostovite, a rare telluride mineral containing copper and gold, AuCuTe4
Copper sulfide
Copper selenide